Fort Elliott Consolidated Independent School District is a public school district based in the community of Briscoe, Texas (USA).

The district covers northern Wheeler County (including the city of Mobeetie and the community of Allison), southern Hemphill County, and a small portion of northeastern Gray County.

Fort Elliott Consolidated ISD has two schools that serve students in grades pre-kindergarten through twelve.

The district was created on August 10, 1991 by the consolidation of the Briscoe and Mobeetie districts, with the Allison Independent School District being added on July 1, 2003.

In 2009, the school district was rated "academically acceptable" by the Texas Education Agency.

References

External links 
 Fort Elliott Consolidated ISD

School districts in Gray County, Texas
School districts in Hemphill County, Texas
School districts in Wheeler County, Texas
School districts established in 1991
1991 establishments in Texas